The Karasuk culture describes a group of late Bronze Age societies who ranged from the Aral Sea to the upper Yenisei in the east and south to the Altai Mountains and the Tian Shan in ca. 1500–800 BC.

Overview
The distribution of the Karasuk culture covers the eastern parts of the Andronovo culture, which it appears to replace. The remains of settlements are minimal, and entirely of the mortuary variety. At least 2000 burials are known. The Karasuk period persisted down to c. 700 BC. From c. 700 to c. 200 BC, culture developed along similar lines. Vital trade contact is traced from northern China and the Baikal region to the Black Sea and the Urals, influencing the uniformity of the culture. The Karasuk was succeeded by the Tagar culture.

The economy was mixed agriculture and stockbreeding. Its culture appears to have been more mobile than the Andronovo. The Karasuk were farmers who practiced metallurgy on a large scale. Arsenical bronze artefacts are present. Their settlements were of pit houses and they buried their dead in stone cists covered by kurgans and surrounded by square stone enclosures. Industrially, they were skilled metalworkers, the diagnostic artifacts of the culture being a bronze knife with curving profiles and a decorated handle and horse bridles. The pottery has been compared to that discovered in Inner Mongolia and the interior of China, with burials bronze knives similar to those from northeastern China. Their realistic animal art probably contributed to the development of the Scytho-Siberian animal art style (Scythian art).

The origins of the Karasuk culture are complex, but it is generally accepted that its origins lie both with the Andronovo culture and local cultures of the Yenisei. The ethnic identity of the Karasuk is problematic, as the Andronovo culture has been associated with the Indo-Iranians while the local cultures have been considered as unconnected to the steppe. Nevertheless, a specifically Proto-Iranian identity has been proposed for the Karasuk culture. The Karasuk tribes have been described by archaeologists as exhibiting pronounced Caucasoid/Europoid features. George van Driem has suggested a connection with the Yeniseian and Burushaski people, proposing a Karasuk languages group.

Keyser rt al. (2009) published a genetic study of ancient Siberian cultures, the Andronovo culture, the Karasuk culture, the Tagar culture and the Tashtyk culture. 
They surveyed four individuals of the Karasuk culture of four different sites from 1400 BC to 800 BC.
Two of these possessed the Western Eurasian mtDNA U5a1 and U4 lineages.
Two other ones exhibited the Y-chromosome haplogroup R1a1, which is thought to mark the eastward migration of the early Indo-Europeans. The individuals surveyed were all determined to be Europoid and light-eyed.

References

Citations

Sources

Bronze Age cultures of Asia
Archaeological cultures of Siberia
Archaeological cultures of Central Asia
Iranian archaeological cultures
Archaeological cultures in Kazakhstan
Archaeological cultures in Russia